Vadugapatti is a small village in Karur district in the Indian state of Tamil Nadu.  It is located 8 km northwest from Pallapatti or 10 km southwest from Aravakurichi. The total population is around 350. But the natives of this village are residing out side. As a grant total, it covers a population of around 2000. It is a dry area with very poor rainfall. The main occupation of the people is sheep rearing. In addition, they cultivate drumstick, sorghum, millets, cotton, chili etc.

References

Villages in Karur district